Artempo: Where Time Becomes Art was an encyclopedic art exhibition created for the Palazzo Fortuny, Venice in 2007. It examined the relationship between art and time, and the power of display.

The exhibition included variations of cultures and periods, and featured objects ranging from simple "objecte trouve", archaeological materials, applied art, old, classical, and modern art, to contemporary installations.

The exhibition was made by Mattijs Visser and Axel Vervoordt, together with Jean-Hubert Martin. The accompanying book included essays by philosopher Massimo Cacciari, the curator from Magiciens de la terre, Jean-Hubert Martin, the former director of Centre Georges Pompidou, Heinz-Norbert Jocks, as well as Eddi de Wolf and Visser.

Palazzo Fortuny 
Artempo was housed in the Venezian-Gothic Palazzo Fortuny, Mariano Fortuny's former home, studio, showroom, and "Think-Tank". Fortuny's own art ranged across many fields, and he was also an eclectic art-collector, as well as an organizer of lectures, concerts, and discussions. Artempo was designed with the spirit of Fortuny in mind, utilizing the Palazzo as a "Laboratory of Ideas".

In 2009 the Museum Palazzo Fortuny organized a second exhibition, titled In-Finitum, built around the ideas from Fortuny and Artempo.

Artists
Along with objects from different periods and cultures, artists who were on display at Artempo were:

 Marina Abramović
 El Anatsui
 Arman
 Antonin Artaud
 Francis Bacon
 Erzsebet Baerveldt
 Hans Bellmer
 Alighiero Boetti
 Christian Boltanski
 Michael Borremans
 Louise Bourgeois
 André Breton
 Peter Buggenhout
 Alberto Burri
 Cai Guo-Qiang
 Enrico Castellani
 Loris Cecchini
 Tony Cragg
 Yael Davids
 Berlinde De Bruyckere
 Giorgio de Chirico
 Jean Dubuffet
 Marcel Duchamp
 Marlene Dumas
 Jan Fabre
 Robert Filliou
 Fischli & Weiss
 Lucio Fontana
 Mariano Fortuny
 Alberto Giacometti
 Gotthard Graubner
 Thomas Grünfeld
 Gutai
 Anish Kapoor
 On Kawara
 William Kentridge
 Kimsooja
 Yves Klein
 Bertrand Lavier
 Jean-Jacques Lebel
 Man Ray
 Piero Manzoni
 Gordon Matta-Clark
 Marisa Merz
 Sabrine Mezzaqui
 Tatsuo Miyajima
 Jorge Molder
 Sadamasa Motonaga
 Klaus Münch
 Saburo Murakami
 Roman Opalka
 Orlan
 Pablo Picasso
 Otto Piene
 Markus Raetz
 Robert Rauschenberg
 Charles Ross
 Medardo Rosso
 Thomas Ruff
 Claude Rutault
 Richard Serra
 Shozo Shimamoto
 Fujiko Shiraga
 Kazuo Shiraga
 Thomas Schütte
 Curt Stenvert
 Dominique Stroobant
 Shiro Tsujimura
 Antoni Tàpies
 James Turrell
 Günther Uecker
 Emilio Vedova
 Jef Verheyen
 Andy Warhol
 Adolfo Wildt
 Tsuruko Yamazaki
 ZERO

References

External links
Robert C. Morgan in The Brooklyn Rail
Charles Giuliano in Maverick Arts

Art exhibitions in Italy
Culture in Venice